The 1877 St. Louis Brown Stockings finished the season in fourth place in the National League. After the season, they signed Louisville Grays stars Jim Devlin and George Hall. However, both became involved in a game-fixing scandal that led to the permanent expulsion of the two players (and others) from the league. The Grays and Brown Stockings both folded in the aftermath of the scandal.

Regular season

Season standings

Record vs. opponents

Roster

Player stats

Batting

Starters by position
Note: Pos = Position; G = Games played; AB = At bats; H = Hits; Avg. = Batting average; HR = Home runs; RBI = Runs batted in

Other batters
Note: G = Games played; AB = At bats; H = Hits; Avg. = Batting average; HR = Home runs; RBI = Runs batted in

Pitching

Starting pitchers
Note: G = Games pitched; IP = Innings pitched; W = Wins; L = Losses; ERA = Earned run average; SO = Strikeouts

Relief pitchers
Note: G = Games pitched; W = Wins; L = Losses; SV = Saves; ERA = Earned run average; SO = Strikeouts

References
1877 St. Louis Brown Stockings season at Baseball Reference

St. Louis Brown Stockings seasons
Saint Louis Brown Stockings season